The 2018 Boyd Tinsley Clay Court Classic was a professional tennis tournament played on outdoor clay courts. It was the seventeenth edition of the tournament and was part of the 2018 ITF Women's Circuit. It took place in Charlottesville, United States, on 23–29 April 2018.

Singles main draw entrants

Seeds 

 1 Rankings as of 16 April 2018.

Other entrants 
The following players received a wildcard into the singles main draw:
  Julia Elbaba
  Allie Kiick
  Katerina Stewart

The following players received entry from the qualifying draw:
  Sophie Chang
  Mari Osaka
  Camilla Rosatello
  Iga Świątek

The following player received entry as a Lucky Loser:
  Ana Sofía Sánchez

Champions

Singles

 Mariana Duque Mariño def.  Anhelina Kalinina, 0–6, 6–1, 6–2

Doubles
 
 Sophie Chang /  Alexandra Mueller def.  Ashley Kratzer /  Whitney Osuigwe, 3–6, 6–4, [10–7]

External links 
 2018 Boyd Tinsley Clay Court Classic at ITFtennis.com

2018 ITF Women's Circuit
2018 in American tennis
Tennis tournaments in the United States
Tennis in Virginia